Oncești is a commune in Bacău County, Western Moldavia, Romania. It is composed of seven villages: Bărboasa, Dealu Perjului, Oncești, Onceștii Vechi, Satu Nou, Tarnița and Taula.

References

Communes in Bacău County
Localities in Western Moldavia